Alba Caride (April 24, 1980, Vigo, Province of Pontevedra) is a Spanish rhythmic gymnast.

Caride competed for Spain in the rhythmic gymnastics individual all-around competition at the 1996 Summer Olympics in Atlanta. There she tied for 11th place in the qualification and advanced to the semifinal, in the semifinal she was 19th and didn't advance to the final of 10 competitors.

References

External links 
 
 

1980 births
Living people
Spanish rhythmic gymnasts
Gymnasts at the 1996 Summer Olympics
Olympic gymnasts of Spain
Sportspeople from Vigo